Mission command, also referred to as mission-type tactics, is a style of military command, which is derived from the Prussian-pioneered mission-type tactics doctrine, combines centralized intent with decentralized execution subsidiarity, and promotes freedom and speed of action, and initiative within defined constraints. Subordinates, understanding the commander's intentions, their own missions, and the context of those missions, are told what effect they are to achieve and the reason that it needs to be achieved. Subordinates then decide within their delegated freedom of action how best to achieve their missions. Orders focus on providing intent, control measures, and objectives and allow for greater freedom of action by subordinate commanders. Mission command is closely related to civilian management concept of workplace empowerment, and its use in business has been explored by writers such as Bungay (2011) and Tozer (1995, 2012). It is advocated but not always used by the militaries of the United States, Canada, Netherlands, Australia and the United Kingdom. Mission command is compatible with modern military net-centric concepts, and less centralized approaches to command and control (C2) in general.

History 
Originating from the Napoleonic corps concept, increasingly larger armies prevented movement en bloc. Commanders often separated by miles, communicating through horse-carried dispatches, were expected to maneuver in concert with one another. Beginning as early as 1807, the Prussian high command began to emphasize a battle philosophy that Moltke would later describe as:A favourable situation will never be exploited if commanders wait for orders. The highest commander and the youngest soldier must be conscious of the fact that omission and inactivity are worse than resorting to the wrong expedient Continued focus on tactical initiative at the lowest levels developed within the German army through the First World War and formally became Auftragstaktik during the Second World War. Despite the exceptional performance of the Wehrmacht at the tactical level, mission command was not adopted by NATO commanders until the 1970s.  

The break up of the Former Yugoslavia in the 1990s drew in contingents from several modern militaries to United Nations or two stabilization forces (IFOR and SFOR).  One was NORDBAT 2, consisting of a reinforced Swedish-Danish-Norwegian mechanized battalion in United Nations Protection Force (UNPROFOR). The infantry were Swedish volunteers, tanks from a Danish Leopard company, and a Norwegian helicopter detachment, under Swedish command. Coming from a nation that had not experienced war for almost 200 years, the Swedish leaders faced an unresponsive UN bureaucracy, an unclear mandate, and conflicting UN-imposed rules of engagement.  Not unexpectedly, the Swedes turned to their culture of mission command which had grown and developed over decades preparing for expected invasions.  Mission command turned out to be a force multiplier and an effective strategic asset.  When facing ethical and practical challenges to its clear orders to protect the civilian population, commanders realized they had no choice but to disregard orders that conflicted with the purpose of the mission.  Mission command gave permission to every level of command to interpret orders that could be disobeyed and rules could be broken as long as the mission was successful.

Modern usage

Principles 
 Build cohesive teams through mutual trust
 Create shared understanding
 Provide a clear commander’s intent
 Exercise disciplined initiative
 Use mission orders
 Competence
 Risk acceptance.

See also 
 Command by negation
 International Command and Control Research and Technology Symposium
 Maneuver warfare
 Operational art

External links 
 Command notes
 Stephen Bungay: Moltke – Master of Modern Management

References 

Command and control